van Eldik is a surname. Notable people with the surname include:

Matthew van Eldik (born 1970), Australian paralympic athlete
Mark van Eldik (born 1967), Dutch rally driver

Surnames of Dutch origin